Marston is a city in New Madrid County, Missouri, United States. The population was 503 at the 2010 census.

History
A post office called Marston has been in operation since 1898. The community was named after the mother's maiden name of an early settler. Marston was incorporated in 1905.

Geography
Marston is located at  (36.517005, -89.610350). The city is situated along U.S. Route 61, just west of the Mississippi River. Interstate 55 passes through the eastern part of the city. Both I-55 and US 61 connect Marston with New Madrid to the northeast and Portageville to the southwest.

Demographics

2010 census
As of the census of 2010, there were 503 people, 226 households, and 137 families living in the city. The racial makeup of the city was 80.12% White, 17.69% Black or African American, 0.20% Native American, 0.20% Native Hawaiian or Pacific Islander, and 1.79% from two or more races. Hispanic or Latino of any race were 0.40% of the population.

There were 226 households, of which 28.8% had children under the age of 18 living with them, 38.5% were married couples living together, 16.4% had a female householder with no husband present, 5.8% had a male householder with no wife present, and 39.4% were non-families. 34.5% of all households were made up of individuals, and 11.6% had someone living alone who was 65 years of age or older. The average household size was 2.23 and the average family size was 2.82.

The median age in the city was 42.1 years. 22.3% of residents were under the age of 18; 8.3% were between the ages of 18 and 24; 23.6% were from 25 to 44; 31.5% were from 45 to 64; and 14.7% were 65 years of age or older. The gender makeup of the city was 46.5% male and 53.5% female.

2000 census
As of the census of 2000, there were 610 people, 259 households, and 167 families living in the city. The population density was 553.7 people per square mile (214.1/km). There were 302 housing units at an average density of 274.1 per square mile (106.0/km). The racial makeup of the city was 76.39% White, 22.46% African American, 0.16% Native American, and 0.98% from two or more races. Hispanic or Latino of any race were 2.30% of the population.

There were 259 households, out of which 32.0% had children under the age of 18 living with them, 44.4% were married couples living together, 15.8% had a female householder with no husband present, and 35.5% were non-families. 31.3% of all households were made up of individuals, and 14.3% had someone living alone who was 65 years of age or older. The average household size was 2.36 and the average family size was 2.93.

In the city the population was spread out, with 26.4% under the age of 18, 8.7% from 18 to 24, 27.4% from 25 to 44, 22.0% from 45 to 64, and 15.6% who were 65 years of age or older. The median age was 37 years. For every 100 females, there were 94.3 males. For every 100 females age 18 and over, there were 90.3 males.

The median income for a household in the city was $20,375, and the median income for a family was $26,167. Males had a median income of $27,292 versus $20,000 for females. The per capita income for the city was $13,820. About 28.9% of families and 31.0% of the population were below the poverty line, including 41.8% of those under age 18 and 26.2% of those age 65 or over.

References

External links

Cities in New Madrid County, Missouri
Missouri populated places on the Mississippi River
Cities in Missouri